Glee: The Music, Journey to Regionals is the second extended play (EP) by the cast of musical television series Glee. Containing six songs from the season one finale "Journey to Regionals", it was released on June 8, 2010, the same day the episode aired. Half of the tracks are cover versions of songs by American rock band Journey. The EP debuted at the top of the US Billboard 200 and Soundtrack charts, with first-week sales of 154,000 copies. Unlike previous Glee releases, no singles were released from this album, but all of its tracks managed to appear on multiple national charts. Songs were generally received favorably, with many enjoying the Journey covers. The setlist of Glee Live! In Concert!, the cast's first concert tour, included three songs from the Glee: The Music, Journey to Regionals.

Background and composition

The season one finale of Glee first aired on Fox on June 8, 2010, in the US. The episode sees the fictional William McKinley High School glee club New Directions compete at the 2010 Midwest Regional Show Choir Championships. Director Will Schuester (Matthew Morrison) decides to have New Directions pay tribute to American rock band Journey. This was not only as homage to the cast's cover of "Don't Stop Believin' in the season one premiere that led to his decision to remain at the school, but as a representation of the path undertaken to arrive at the Regionals level of competition. They perform a medley of Journey songs: the love ballad "Faithfully", with Lea Michele and Cory Monteith on lead vocals as Rachel Berry and Finn Hudson, respectively, transitions into a mashup of "Any Way You Want It" and "Lovin', Touchin', Squeezin". This ends with a reprise of "Don't Stop Believin", where each cast member sings a portion of the song. Rival choir Vocal Adrenaline performs a cover of Queen's "Bohemian Rhapsody" thereafter, with Jesse (Jonathan Groff) on lead vocals. At the end of the episode, New Directions decides to show appreciation for Schuester with a rendition of Lulu's "To Sir With Love", the theme of the 1967 film of the same name. He returns the honor, performing Israel Kamakawiwoʻole's reinvention of "Over the Rainbow" along with glee club member Puck (Mark Salling).

The EP, along with its track listing, was announced in an official press release on May 26, 2010. It was released on June 8, 2010 in the US, and on June 14, 2010, in the UK. "Lovin', Touchin', Squeezin" was previously covered in the series' pilot episode. The 1981 single "Don't Stop Believin" was also previously performed in the pilot, as well as in the season one episode "The Rhodes Not Taken". The songs in the EP all fall under the genres of pop and rock.

Critical reception

The Denver Post Ricardo Baca enjoyed the familiar nature of the songs on the EP, and liked "Faithfully" best of the Journey covers. He felt, however, that the music of "Don't Stop Believin" outshone the vocals of the cast. Andrew Leahey of AllMusic gave the album a rating of two-and-a-half stars out of five.  A writer for Reuters called the Journey medley "heartfelt and uplifting" and Jessica Derschowitz of CBS News found it "fantastic". Gerrick Kennedy also enjoyed it, highlighting its emotional nature and complimenting the entire cast's vocals. IGN's Eric Goldman thought the reprise of "Don't Stop Believin" worked well, and liked not only the connection to the pilot, but also its musical rearrangement. Bobby Hankinson of The Houston Chronicle enjoyed "Don't Stop Believin" best of the performances but Vanity Fair'''s Brett Berk deemed it unnecessary in the medley, and felt the cast would have done better to showcase more of "Lovin', Touchin', Squeezin".  Berk enjoyed "Bohemian Rhapsody" best, giving it a rating of four stars out of a possible five, though he thought it was too predictable a song choice. Time James Poniewozik opined the song was one of Glee best, but was contemplative of which choir's performance was the better. Berk felt the lyrical context of "To Sir With Love" was trite and Hankinson was impressed by the song, calling it "sweet". "Over the Rainbow" was called "lovely" by the former and Derschowitz decided it was a "perfect" closing song.

Former Journey frontman Steve Perry gave an interview to American magazine RadarOnline, as co-writer of several Journey tracks, and praised the use of his songs on the show: "Glee has opened up  catalog of songwriting and introduced those songs to a whole new generation that would have otherwise never heard them." The Regionals version of "Don't Stop Believin" earned a Grammy nomination for Best Pop Performance by a Duo or Group with Vocals for the ceremonies in 2011. Following this nomination, the song was included on the compilation album 2011 Grammy Nominees.

Chart performance

The EP debuted at number one on both the US Billboard 200 and Soundtracks charts, selling 154,000 copies there. The album became the cast's third number-one album on the Billboard 200.  Reaching the top of the chart on  June 26, 2010, it did so three weeks after Glee: The Music, Volume 3 Showstoppers.  This beat the cast's own record for the shortest span between number-one debuts with different releases, previously held with Glee: The Music, The Power of Madonna and Volume 3 Showstoppers. It entered at number two in Canada and the United Kingdom, selling 14,000 copies in the former. On the Irish Albums Chart, Journey to Regionals entered the week of June 10, 2010 at number 14 and ascended to the top position the next week, taking the spot from Volume 3 Showstoppers. The EP entered at number seven in Australia on July 4, 2010, climbing four places to its peak three weeks later, and in Mexico, a peak of fifty-nine was reached. Second-week sales in the US amounted to 39,000 copies as the EP dropped to the tenth position on the Billboard 200. The EP has spent a total of 39 weeks on the Soundtracks chart.

Although none of the tracks were released as singles, all of the tracks managed to chart in several countries (with the new version of "Don't Stop Believin'" charting under the original entry). On the Billboard Hot 100, "Faithfully" debuted highest the week of June 26, 2010, at number 37. The same week on the Canadian Hot 100, "Over the Rainbow" led the Glee debuts at number 31. The song was also highest on the Australian and UK Singles Chart, at numbers 42 and 30, respectively. In Ireland, "Any Way You Want It / Lovin' Touchin' Squeezin" charted as highest of the Glee entries at number twenty on June 17, 2010. "Don't Stop Believin" was regarded as a re-entry of the group's debut single by most chart companies; in addition to the debut of the new tracks, it climbed from 71 to 33 in the UK and from 49 to 24 in Ireland. It re-entered the single charts of the US at 59 and Canada at 37, setting a new peak for the song in the latter. Only the Australian Recording Industry Association regarded it as a separate song, who placed it at number 67 the week of July 12, 2010.

With sales figures provided by Nielsen SoundScan, a list of the twenty most successful Glee songs was released by Yahoo! Music on October 22, 2010. The best-selling song, with 1,005,000 copies sold, was "Don't Stop Believin"—84,000 of those came from sales of the Regionals reprise. "Faithfully" was also on the list, at number eighteen with 159,000 copies. The EP's five new Billboard Hot 100 entries brought the cast's total appearances on the chart to 64, an accomplishment that placed them seventh among all artists, between Elton John (67) and Stevie Wonder (63). Billboard noted an increase in sales of the original seven songs rising in percentages ranging from 23% ("Don't Stop Believin") to 557% ("To Sir With Love"). Additionally, Journey's compilation Greatest Hits (1988) saw a 62% increase in sales, rising from 104 to 57 on the Billboard 200.

Promotion
The cast embarked on an American concert tour, Glee Live! In Concert! starting in May 2010 in promotion of their first season. From the EP, "Faithfully" and "Any Way You Want It / Lovin' Touchin' Squeezin" were included on the set list. Morrison appeared on dates in New York City to sing "Over the Rainbow" whilst playing the ukulele. He was accompanied by Salling when he again sang the number at the annual White House Easter Egg Roll in 2010. In addition, he also performed the song at The O2 Arena in London with Leona Lewis on June 16, 2010, as part of Lewis' tour, The Labyrinth. On December 5, 2010, the cast appeared on the seventh season of UK reality TV series The X Factor'' to perform "Don't Stop Believin".

Track listing

Personnel
Source: allmusic.

Musicians

Dianna Agron – vocals
Harold Arlen – composer
Don Black – composer
Jonathan Cain – composer
Chris Colfer – vocals, featured vocals
Jonathan Groff – featured vocals
E.Y. "Yip" Harburg – composer
Mark London – composer
Jane Lynch – vocals (credit only)
Jayma Mays – vocals (credit only)

Kevin McHale – vocals, featured vocals
Freddie Mercury – composer
Lea Michele – vocals, featured vocals
Cory Monteith – vocals, featured vocals
Matthew Morrison – featured vocals
Steve Perry – composer
Amber Riley – vocals, featured vocals
Naya Rivera – vocals, featured vocals
Mark Salling – vocals, featured vocals
Neal Schon – composer
Jenna Ushkowitz – vocals, featured vocals

Technical

Adam Anders – engineer, producer, soundtrack producer, vocal arrangement
Peer Åström – engineer, mixing, producer
Dave Bett – art direction, design
P.J. Bloom – music supervisor
Geoff Bywater – executive in charge of music
Tim Davis – vocal arrangement, vocal contractor
Dante Di Loreto – soundtrack executive producer
Brad Falchuk – soundtrack executive producer

Heather Guibert – coordination
Robin Koehler – coordination
Meaghan Lyons – coordination
Dominick Maita – mastering
Maria Paula Marulanda – art direction, design
Ryan Murphy – producer, soundtrack producer
Ryan Peterson – engineer
Miranda Penn Turin – photography

Charts

Weekly charts

Year-end charts

Release history

References

2010 EPs
2010 soundtrack albums
Columbia Records EPs
Covers EPs
Glee (TV series) albums